Dan Law Field at Rip Griffin Park, nicknamed "The Law", is the home stadium of the Texas Tech Red Raiders baseball team in Lubbock, Texas. It is located on the Texas Tech University campus, adjacent to Jones AT&T Stadium and Fuller Track. Dan Law Field was rated as one of the top three places to watch a college baseball game by Sports Illustrated On Campus.

Name and capacity
From 1988 through 2011, the ballpark was named Dan Law Field after Alabama native, Lubbock businessman, and former Texas Tech baseball player Dan Law (1932–2019), who was instrumental in the renovation of the stadium. Law played for the Red Raider football team from 1955 to 1956 and baseball from 1956 to 1957. Since the 2012 season, the ballpark has been known as Dan Law Field at Rip Griffin Park. An anonymous donor to the 2012 renovation requested the field be named after Rip Griffin, a long-time supporter of Red Raider baseball and Texas Tech athletics. The ballpark has a permanent seating capacity of 4,368. Renovated in 1996 and 2001, the stadium underwent another upgrade in 2007 and its latest in 2012.

In 2015, the Red Raiders ranked 13th among Division I baseball programs in attendance, averaging 3,665 per home game. A record attendance of 4,898 was set on June 12, 2016, when Texas Tech hosted East Carolina University in the Lubbock Super Regional matchup.

Usage

Texas Tech Red Raiders

Lubbock Crickets

Tournaments
NCAA Division I Baseball Tournament Regional: 1996, 1997, 1999, 2016, 2017, 2018
NCAA Division I Baseball Tournament Super Regional: 2014, 2016, 2018
NJCAA Division I Southwestern District Baseball Tournament: 2011, 2012, 2014–2017
SWC Tournament: 1996

See also
 List of NCAA Division I baseball venues

References

External links
Texas Tech baseball - Dan Law Field at Rip Griffin Park

Texas Tech Red Raiders baseball
College baseball venues in the United States
Minor league baseball venues
Texas Tech Red Raiders sports venues
Baseball venues in Texas
Baseball in Lubbock, Texas
Sports venues in Lubbock, Texas
Southwest Conference Baseball Tournament venues
1926 establishments in Texas
Sports venues completed in 1926